Licun is a town under the administration of Luquan District, Shijiazhuang, in southwestern Hebei province, China, located  north-northeast of downtown Luquan District and in the northwestern suburbs of Shijiazhuang. , it has 23 villages under its administration.

See also
List of township-level divisions of Hebei

References

Township-level divisions of Hebei